Faraj Beygi (also known as Faraj Beygī (romanized) and as Shahrak-e Yamīnābād) is a village in Zirab Rural District, in the Central District of Zarrin Dasht County, Fars Province, Iran. According to the 2006 census, its population was 580 people from 124 families.

References 

Populated places in Zarrin Dasht County